Events from the year 1997 in Nepal.

Incumbents 

 Monarch: King Birendra
 Prime Minister: Sher Bahadur Deuba (1995-12 March 1997); Lokendra Bahadur Chand (12 March-7 October 1997); Surya Bahadur Thapa
 Chief Justice: Surendra Prasad Singh, Trilok Pratap Rana, Om Bhakta Shrestha

Events 

 June – Inder Kumar Gujral, Prime Minister of India visits Nepal.

Births 

 22 January - Kushal Bhurtel

 5 October – Aarif Sheikh

Deaths 

 11 September – Matrika Prasad Koirala
 18 September – Ganesh Man Singh

References 

 
Nepal
Nepal
1990s in Nepal
Years of the 20th century in Nepal